Woodlands railway station was a railway station on the Singapore-Johore Railway which allowed passengers to access ferries bound for Johor from 1903 to 1923.

History
Woodlands railway station was opened to the public on 10 April 1903 as the new northern terminus of the line, as part of the extension of the railway from Bukit Panjang railway station, which also included a station at Bukit Panjang, which had not yet finished construction by the time the extension had opened. The station allowed for quicker and more convenient access to ferries, which were bound for Johor. The station replaced the bus, which previously ran the route. Despite being in close proximity to the nearby village of Kranji, there was no road connecting the station to the village, thus rendering it impossible for residents of Kranji to utilise the station. The station was serviced by a police station, which opened shortly after the opening of the station. The land surrounding the station was owned by the railway, and a rule was implemented in which entering the premises of the station would cost an extra five cents. This included the nearby piers, the police station, the post office box and the ticket office.

The station was not used often, as it was too far away from town. When the station first opened, many of the employees caught a severe illness and had to be sent to the hospital. The opening of Johor Bahru railway station likely lessened the passenger traffic in the station, as they replaced the ferries going to Johor.

The station was abandoned in 1923, and was later demolished, being replaced by a petrol station. The site of the former station was one of several possible locations for a railbus station for the railbus line that the Keretapi Tanah Melayu (KTM) planned to built in Singapore.

Routes

References

Railway stations in Singapore opened in 1903
Defunct railway stations in Singapore